Fort Grama Niladhari Division is a  Grama Niladhari Division of the  Colombo Divisional Secretariat  of Colombo District  of Western Province, Sri Lanka .

Sambodhi Chaithya  are located within, nearby or associated with Fort.

Fort is a surrounded by the  Pettah, Suduwella, Hunupitiya, Slave Island and Galle Face  Grama Niladhari Divisions.

Demographics

Ethnicity 

The Fort Grama Niladhari Division has  a Sinhalese majority (92.9%) . In comparison, the Colombo Divisional Secretariat (which contains the Fort Grama Niladhari Division) has  a Moor plurality (40.1%), a significant Sri Lankan Tamil population (31.1%) and a significant Sinhalese population (25.0%)

Religion 

The Fort Grama Niladhari Division has  a Buddhist majority (91.2%) . In comparison, the Colombo Divisional Secretariat (which contains the Fort Grama Niladhari Division) has  a Muslim plurality (41.8%), a significant Hindu population (22.7%), a significant Buddhist population (19.0%) and a significant Roman Catholic population (13.1%)

Gallery

References 

Grama Niladhari Divisions of Colombo Divisional Secretariat